or Kang Il-Sung (Korean: 강일성, Hanja: 康一成) is a former Japanese football player of Korean descent.

Playing career
Okayama was born in Sakai on April 24, 1978. After graduating from high school, he joined J1 League club Yokohama Marinos (later Yokohama F. Marinos) in 1997. On September 6, he debuted as forward and scored a goal against Sanfrecce Hiroshima. After the debut, he scored a goal for 3 matches in a row. However he could hardly play in the match from 1998. In June 1999, he moved to J2 League club Omiya Ardija. In 2000, he returned to Yokohama F. Marinos. He was converted to center back and played many matches. In 2001, he moved to Cerezo Osaka. He played many matches as forward. In 2002, he moved to J2 club Kawasaki Frontale and became a regular player as right defender of three backs defense. Although he played many matches in 2003, he could not play as starting member in most matches and he could hardly play in the match in 2004. In 2005, he moved to Avispa Fukuoka. He played many matches as mainly center back and the club was promoted to J1 end of 2005 season. However he moved to J2 club Kashiwa Reysol in 2006. He played many matches as center back and the club was promoted to J1 from 2007 season. However he could hardly play in the match in 2007 and he moved to J2 club Vegalta Sendai in August 2007. He played as regular center back in 2 seasons. After a half year blank, he moved to South Korean club Pohang Steelers in July 2009. He played for the club in 2 seasons and returned to Japan end of 2010 season. After a half year blank, he joined to Consadole Sapporo in June 2011. However he could hardly play in the match and left the club end of 2012 season. In August 2013, he joined Regional Leagues club Nara Club. The club was promoted to Japan Football League from 2015. He retired end of 2017 season.

Club statistics

Honours

Club
Pohang Steelers
League Cup: 2009
AFC Champions League: 2009

References

External links 
 

 

1978 births
Living people
Association football people from Osaka Prefecture
People from Sakai, Osaka
Japanese footballers
Japanese people of Korean descent
J1 League players
J2 League players
Japan Football League players
K League 1 players
Yokohama F. Marinos players
Omiya Ardija players
Cerezo Osaka players
Kawasaki Frontale players
Avispa Fukuoka players
Kashiwa Reysol players
Vegalta Sendai players
Pohang Steelers players
Hokkaido Consadole Sapporo players
Nara Club players
Japanese expatriate footballers
Expatriate footballers in South Korea
Japanese expatriate sportspeople in South Korea
Naturalized citizens of Japan
Zainichi Korean people
Association football defenders
Association football forwards